One If By Land, Two If By Sea is a fine dining restaurant located at 17 Barrow Street (between Seventh Avenue South and West 4th Street) in the West Village of the New York City Manhattan borough.

Reviews and reception
In 2013, Zagat gave it a food rating of 24, with a decor rating of 27, and wrote: "'Prepare to be swept away' by this 'gorgeous' Village American." In 1998, as food critic for The New York Times, Ruth Reichl gave the restaurant a mixed, one star review. She criticized the restaurant's Beef Wellington. In 2005, also as the restaurant critic for the New York Times, Frank Bruni gave the restaurant a negative review, criticizing the food, and concluding it was too reliant on its ambience and reputation.

The restaurant has been accused of segregating Asian diners on the second floor as well as treating them poorly. Such allegations were discovered to have been recorded in Yelp reviews for years.

See also
 List of New American restaurants

References

External links
 

1767 establishments in the Province of New York
1910 establishments in New York City
Aaron Burr
Commercial buildings completed in 1767
Fine dining
French restaurants in New York City
New American restaurants in New York (state)
Restaurants established in 1910
Restaurants in Manhattan
Reportedly haunted locations in New York (state)